Pedda Manushulu may refer to:
 Pedda Manushulu (1954 film), an Indian Telugu-language drama film
 Pedda Manushulu (1999 film), a Telugu-language film